Moquiniastrum is a genus of flowering plants belonging to the family Asteraceae.

Its native range is Venezuelan Antilles to Southern Tropical America. It is found in Argentina, Bolivia, Brazil, Paraguay, Uruguay, Venezuela and Venezuelan Antilles.

The genus name of Moquiniastrum is in honour of Alfred Moquin-Tandon (1804–1863), a French naturalist and doctor. 
It was first described and published in Phytotaxa Vol.147 on page 29 in 2013.

Known species
According to Kew:

Moquiniastrum argentinum 
Moquiniastrum argyreum 
Moquiniastrum barrosoae 
Moquiniastrum blanchetianum 
Moquiniastrum bolivianum 
Moquiniastrum cinereum 
Moquiniastrum cordatum 
Moquiniastrum densicephalum 
Moquiniastrum discolor 
Moquiniastrum floribundum 
Moquiniastrum gardneri 
Moquiniastrum glabrum 
Moquiniastrum hatschbachii 
Moquiniastrum haumanianum 
Moquiniastrum mollissimum 
Moquiniastrum oligocephalum 
Moquiniastrum paniculatum 
Moquiniastrum polymorphum 
Moquiniastrum pulchrum 
Moquiniastrum ramboi 
Moquiniastrum sordidum 
Moquiniastrum velutinum

References

Gochnatioideae
Asteraceae genera
Plants described in 1845
Flora of the Venezuelan Antilles
Flora of Venezuela
Flora of Bolivia
Flora of Brazil
Flora of southern South America